Csaba Králik (born 24 June 1992) is a Slovak football midfielder  of Hungarian ethnicity who currently plays for FC ŠTK 1914 Šamorín.

External links
at fkdac1904.eu

References

1992 births
Living people
Slovak footballers
Association football midfielders
FC DAC 1904 Dunajská Streda players
FC ŠTK 1914 Šamorín players
Slovak Super Liga players
Hungarians in Slovakia
2. Liga (Slovakia) players